Djurö, Värmdö Municipality - an island and a locality situated in Värmdö Municipality, Stockholm County, Sweden
Djurö, Vänern - an island in Lake Vänern, Sweden
Djurö National Park - a national park in Sweden